Operation Condor can have several meanings:

Military operations
 Operation Condor (1954), a French intelligence service GCMA operation during the Battle of Dien Bien Phu on 30 April 1954
 The 1966 Aerolineas Argentinas DC-4 hijacking, also known as "Operativo Cóndor"
 Operation Condor, a campaign of assassination and intelligence-gathering conducted by several Latin American countries in the mid-1970s
 Operation Condor (Afghanistan), a 2002 British-led operation in southeastern Afghanistan
 Operation Condor, a never mounted World War II mission, proposed in conjunction with Operation Constellation, among others

Film
 Armour of God II: Operation Condor, a 1991 film starring Jackie Chan, also known as Operation Condor
 Armour of God (film), a 1986 film starring Jackie Chan, also known as Operation Condor 2: The Armour of the Gods

See also 
 Condor (disambiguation)